The 1996 Bank of Ireland All-Ireland Senior Football Championship was the 110th staging of the All-Ireland Senior Football Championship, the Gaelic Athletic Association's premier inter-county Gaelic football tournament. The championship began on 12 May 1996 and ended on 29 September 1996.

Dublin entered the championship as the defending champions, however, they were defeated by Meath in the Leinster final.

On 29 September 1996, Meath won the championship following a 2-9 to 1-11 defeat of Mayo in a replay of the All-Ireland final. This was their sixth All-Ireland title and their first in eight championship seasons.

Mayo's Maurice Sheridan was the championship's top scorer with 1-33. Meath's Martin O'Connell was the choice for Texaco Footballer of the Year, while his teammate Trevor Giles was selected as the Powerscreen Footballer of the Year.

Leinster Championship format change

The Leinster football championship pre-Quarter final had 2 First-Round & 1 Second-Round game.

Provincial championships

Munster Senior Football Championship

Quarter-finals

 

Semi-finals

 

Final

Leinster Senior Football Championship

First round

 

Second round

Quarter-finals

 
  
 

Semi-finals

 

Final

Source:

Connacht Senior Football Championship

Quarter-finals

 
 

Semi-finals

 

Final

Ulster Senior Football Championship

Preliminary round

Quarter-finals

 
  
  

Semi-finals

  

Final

All-Ireland Senior Football Championship
Semi-finals

Finals

Championship statistics

Top scorers

Overall

Single game

Miscellaneous

 On 12 May 1996, FitzGerald Park, Killmallock hosts its first game for 24 years the Munster Quarter-final meeting of Cork vs Limerick.
 Louth recorded their first championship defeat of Offaly since 1964.
 Mayo defeated Galway in the Connacht final for the first time since 1969.
 Tyrone became the first team to retain the Ulster title since Derry in 1976.
 Meath-Tyrone All Ireland semi-final was the teams' first championship meeting.
 The All-Ireland final ends in a draw and goes to a replay for the first time since 1988.

References